Dominic Enright (1935 - 7 October 2008) was an Irish hurler who played for the Waterford senior team.

Born in Abbeyside, County Waterford, Enright first arrived on the inter-county scene at the age of twenty-two when he first linked up with the senior team. He joined the senior panel during the 1957 championship. Enright was a regular member of the panel over the next few years and won one Munster medal as a non-playing substitute. At club level Enright played hurling withy Abbeyside and Gaelic football with Abbeyside/Ballinacourty. Enright retired from inter-county hurling during the 1959 championship.

Honours

Team
Waterford
Munster Senior Hurling Championship (1): 1957 (sub)

References

1935 births
2008 deaths
Abbeyside hurlers
Ballinacourty Gaelic footballers
Waterford inter-county hurlers